In mathematical representation theory, Steinberg's formula, introduced by , describes the multiplicity of an irreducible representation of a semisimple complex Lie algebra in a tensor product of two irreducible representations.
It is a consequence of the Weyl character formula, and for the Lie algebra sl2 it is essentially the Clebsch–Gordan formula.

Steinberg's formula states that the multiplicity of the irreducible representation of highest weight ν in the tensor product of the irreducible representations with highest weights λ and μ is given by

where W is the Weyl group, ε is the determinant of an element of the Weyl group, ρ is the Weyl vector, and P is the Kostant partition function giving the number of ways of writing a vector as a sum of positive roots.

References

Representation theory
Theorems in harmonic analysis